Marco Antônio may refer to:

 Marco Antônio (footballer, born 1940), born Marco Antônio Garcia Alves, Brazilian football attacking midfielder
 Marco Antônio (footballer, born 1951), born Marco Antônio Feliciano, Brazilian football left-back
 Marco Antônio (footballer, born 1963), born Marco Antônio Paes dos Santos, Brazilian football defender
 Marco Antônio (footballer, born 1978), born Marco Antônio de Freitas Filho, Brazilian football forward
 Marco Antônio (footballer, born 1984), born Marco Antônio Miranda Filho, Brazilian football midfielder
 Marco Antonio (footballer, born 1997), born Marco Antônio Rosa Furtado Júnior, Brazilian football midfielder
 Marco Antônio (footballer, born 2000), born Marco Antônio de Oliveira Coelho, Brazilian football midfielder

See also
 
 
 Marcos Antônio (disambiguation)